Harvey Bartlett Gaul (b. 12 Apr 1881, Brooklyn; d. 1 December 1945, Pittsburgh, Pennsylvania) was an American composer, organist, choirmaster, lecturer, music critic, and writer from Pittsburgh.  He is memorialized by an annual award — the Harvey Gaul Memorial Composition Contest (aka The Harvey Gaul Prize) — bestowed to composers for outstanding work.

He was an organist for 35 years (1910–1945) at Calvary Episcopal Church, Pittsburgh.  He is well known as a composer of church music.

Harvey Gaul Prize winners 
Harvey Gaul Award of the State Federation of Music Clubs (established while he was alive)
 1942 — Catherine Latta

1947: Friends of Harvey Gaul, Inc., contest administrator and sponsor

 1947 — Joseph W. Grant, Albuquerque, Scherzo for organ
 1947 — Robert Elmore, Wayne, Pennsylvania, The Lord Will Come, for mixed voice anthem
 1947 — Francis McCollin, Philadelphia, O Little Town of Bethlehem, for small choir anthem
 1951 — Sgt. Paul Nelson, staff arranger, U.S. Military Academy, Cantata, for soprano solo with chorus, violin, cello, harp
 1954 — Clifford Taylor

1960: Friends of Harvey Gaul, Inc., and the Carnegie Institute of Technology Department of Music, contest co-administrators and cosponsors

 1961 — Richard C. Moffatt (1927–1983)
 1962 — Merrill Ellis
 1969 — Marles Nole Smith (Hon. Mention), Two Movements for Violin and Organ
 19?? — Fisher Tull
 1972 — Jan Bach (tie), Three Sonnette on Woman, for tenor voice and harpsichord
 1972 — Wesley Ward (tie), University of Pittsburgh
 1975 — Robert E. Jager
 1975 — Tom Wirtel (2nd place), Violin and Piano Sonata

1980: The Pittsburgh New Music Ensemble, contest administrator and sponsor

 1983 — Robert D. Morris
 1989 — C. Bryan Rulon
 1991 — David Cleary
 1997 — Derek Bermel
 1999 — Brett Dietz (Hon. Mention)
 2001 — Matthew Fields (Hon. Mention)
 2001 — Pierre D. Jalbert
 2003 — Daniel Kellogg
 2005 — David T. Little
 2007 — Stacy Garrop
 2007 — Robert Paterson (Hon. Mention)
 2007 — Wang Jie (Hon. Mention)
 2009 — Ned McGowan
 2009 — D. J. Sparr (Hon. Mention)
 2009 — Clint Needham (Hon. Mention)
 2011 — Ted Hearne
 2011 — Dan Visconti (Hon. Mention)
 2011 — Sean Friar (Hon. Mention)
 2013 — Dan Visconti
 2013 — Amy Beth Kirsten (Hon. Mention)
 2013 — Kyle Duffee (Hon. Mention)
 2013 — Viet Cuong (Hon. Mention)

Notable students 
 Garth Edmundson
 Mary Wiggins

Family 
Harvey Bartlett Gaul married Harriette Lester Avery (b. 1886, Youngstown, Ohio) June 13, 1908, in Cleveland, Ohio.  They had a two children: a son and a daughter.

The son, James Harvey Gaul, had been an archeologist (Harvard class of 1932, PhD Harvard 1940).  During World War II, as a U.S. Naval Reservist Lieutenant, he died by German firing squad in late January 1945 at the Mauthausen Concentration Camp near Linz, Austria.  Having worked with the Office of Naval Intelligence, in 1944, he had been transferred to the Office of Strategic Services.  He had been captured by the Germans during a combat mission in Czecho-Slovakia, a country where he had worked as an archeologist. The President of the United States presented him with the Distinguished Service Cross (Posthumously).

The daughter, Ione Gaul Walker (1914–1987), a painter, had been married to Hudson Dean Walker (1907–1976), an art dealer.

Death 
Harvey Gaul died December 1, 1945, of injuries from an auto accident.

Notes and references

Notes

General references 

 The New Grove Dictionary of American Music, four volumes, edited by H. Wiley Hitchcock and Stanley Sadie, Macmillan Press, London (1986)
 Obituaries on File, two volumes, compiled by Felice Levy, Facts on File, New York (1979)
 Baker's Biographical Dictionary of Musicians, ninth edition, edited by Laura Kuhn, Schirmer Books, New York (2001)
 Baker's Biographical Dictionary of Twentieth-Century Classical Musicians, by Nicolas Slonimsky, Schirmer Books, New York (1997)

Inline citations

External links 
 Harvey Gaul Composition (official site)
 

1881 births
1945 deaths
Musicians from Pittsburgh
American classical organists
American male organists
American male composers
American composers
20th-century organists
Classical musicians from Pennsylvania
20th-century American male musicians
Male classical organists